Denmark competed at the 2018 European Championships in Berlin, Germany; and Glasgow, United Kingdom from 2 to 12 August 2018 in 5 of 7 sports.

Medallists

|  style="text-align:left; width:70%; vertical-align:top;"|

* Participated in the heats only and received medals.
|  style="text-align:left; width:22%; vertical-align:top;"|

Athletics

A total of 11 athletes have been selected to the team.

Aquatics

Swimming

Men

Women

Cycling

BMX

Mountain biking

Road

Track

Team pursuit

Omnium

Madison

Pursuit

Point race

Scratch

Elimination Race

Golf

Denmark was represented by one men's teams.

Men

Gymnastics

Men

Women

Rowing

Men

Women

Triathlon

References

External links
 European Championships official site 

2018
Nations at the 2018 European Championships
2018 in Danish sport